John F. Ward (June 12, 1904 - March 16, 1973) was an American politician from Maine. A Republican from Millinocket, Maine, Ward served three terms in the Maine House of Representatives (1942–1948) and three terms in the Maine Senate (1948–1954). He served two terms in the leadership of the Maine House, including as Majority Leader (1944–1946) and as Speaker (1946–1948). During Ward's final term in the Maine Senate, he served as president during the 1954 special session.

References

1904 births
1973 deaths
People from Millinocket, Maine
Republican Party members of the Maine House of Representatives
Speakers of the Maine House of Representatives
Presidents of the Maine Senate
20th-century American politicians